Angelo Cerasi (15 October 1643 – 11 December 1728) was a Roman Catholic prelate who served as Bishop of Bovino (1685–1728).

Biography
Angelo Cerasi was born in Buonabitacolo, Italy on 15 October 1643. On 5 February 1685, he was appointed during the papacy of Pope Innocent XI as Bishop of Bovino. On 11 February 1685, he was consecrated bishop by Alessandro Crescenzi (cardinal), Cardinal-Priest of Santa Prisca, with Pier Antonio Capobianco, Bishop Emeritus of Lacedonia, and Giuseppe Felice Barlacci, Bishop of Narni, serving as co-consecrators. He served as Bishop of Bovino until his death on 11 December 1728.

References 

17th-century Italian Roman Catholic bishops
18th-century Italian Roman Catholic bishops
Bishops appointed by Pope Innocent XI
1643 births
1728 deaths